Kelly is a surname in the English language. The name has numerous origins, most notably from the Ui Maine. In some cases it is derived from toponyms located in Ireland and Great Britain, in other cases it is derived from patronyms in the Irish language.

Etymology
In many cases Kelly is an Anglicisation of the Irish surname Ó Ceallaigh (IPA [oːˈcal̪ˠiː]), which means "descendant of Ceallach", but it can also mean warrior or fighter. The personal name Ceallach has been thought to mean "bright-headed", but the current understanding is that the name means "frequenting churches", derived from the Irish ceall. In other cases the surname Kelly is an Anglicisation of the Irish Ó Cadhla, which means "descendant of Cadhla". The O'Kelly or Kelly of the Clan Brasil Mac Coolechan originated as a chieftain clan of the Ulaid.

The surname can also be derived from several place names. For example, the surname can be derived from two places in Scotland: Kelly, near Arbroath; and Kellie, in Fife. The surname can also be derived from a place name in England: Kelly, in Devon. This place name is derived from the Cornish celli, meaning "wood" or "grove".

Prevalence
The surname is one of the most common in Ireland. It is also very common in Galloway, and the Isle of Man. When including all of its variations, the name O'Kelly, Kelly, Kelley, Kellie and the Gaelic form O'Ceallaigh, makes it the most prevalent surname in Ireland. There are approximately half a million people worldwide who bear this name. The name O'Kelly did not spring from a single source, but arose independently in several areas in Ireland, also in Scotland and the Isle of Man and in England. In other areas, notably in Isle of Man, Cornwall and probably in Antrim, the name Kelly arose from Celli, meaning man of the woods.

People with the surname

A–I
Alan Kelly (politician) (born 1975), leader of the Irish Labour Party
Alexandra Filia Kelly, English businesswoman
Amanda Kelly (born 1982), Scottish kickboxer
Amethyst Kelly (born 1990), Australian rapper known as Iggy Azalea
Archie Kelly (1921–2005), Scottish footballer
Arvesta Kelly (born 1945), American basketball player
Autumn Kelly (born 1978), wife of Peter Phillips, grandson of Queen Elizabeth II
Barbara Kelly (1924–2007), Canadian-born English actress
Barbara L. Kelly (born 1966), Scottish-Irish musicologist
Benedictus Marwood Kelly (1785–1867), British naval officer
Bernadette Kelly (born 1964), British civil servant
Bernard Kelly (disambiguation), several people
Bernie Kelly (disambiguation), several people
Brian Kelly (actor) (1931–2005), American actor
Brian Kelly (American football coach) (born 1961), American football coach
Brigit Pegeen Kelly (1951–2016), American poet
Bryan Kelly (born 1934), English composer
Caden Kelly (born 2003), Irish association footballer
Carson Kelly (born 1994), American baseball player
Cassandra Kelly, company director from Australia
Cassandra Kelly (athlete) (born 1963), athlete from New Zealand
Chad Kelly (born 1994), American football player
Charles E. Kelly (soldier) (1920–1985), American soldier
Charles E. Kelly (cartoonist) (1902–1981), Irish cartoonist
Charles L. Kelly (1925–1964), US Army helicopter pilot
Charlie Kelly (disambiguation), multiple people
Chip Kelly (born 1963), American football coach
Chris Kelly (1978–2013), American American hip hop artist. one half of the duo Kris Kross
Claire Kelly (1934–1998), American actress
Clare Kelly (1922–2001), English actress
Colin Kelly (1915–1941), World War II ace pilot
Colin Kelly (American football) (born 1989), American football player
Craig Kelly (actor) (born 1970), British actor
Craig Kelly (politician) (born 1963), Australian politician
Darren Kelly (born 1978), Northern Irish footballer
Dave Kelly (disambiguation), several people
David Kelly (disambiguation), several people
David Patrick Kelly (born 1951), American actor, musician, and lyricist
Dean Lennox Kelly (born 1975), British actor
De-Anne Kelly (born 1954), Australian politician
Derrick Kelly II (born 1995), American football player
Des Kelly (born 1965), British journalist
Don Kelly (baseball) (born 1980), American professional baseball player
Eamon Kelly (actor) (1914–2001), Irish actor and author
Edna F. Kelly (1906–1997), American politician
Edward Kelly (disambiguation)
Ellsworth Kelly (1923–2015), American painter and sculptor
Emma Kelly (1918–2001), American musician
Emmett Kelly (1898–1979), American circus performer
Eric P. Kelly (1884–1960), American author
Erin Kelly, American actress
 Erin Entrada Kelly (born 1977), Filipino-American writer of children's literature
Erin I. Kelly, American philosopher
Ethel Knight Kelly (1875–1949), Canadian–Australian actress and writer
Eugene Kelly (born 1965), Scottish musician
Everett A. Kelly (1928–2018), American politician
Fitzroy Kelly (1796–1880), British judge
Florence Finch Kelly (1858–1939), American journalist and novelist
Fran Kelly, Australian radio journalist
Francis Kelly (Canadian politician) (1803–1879)
Francis Kelly (Medal of Honor) (1860–1938), American sailor
Frank Kelly (disambiguation)
Frederick Kelly (disambiguation)
Gabrielle Kelly, Irish statistician
Gene Kelly (1912–1996), American actor
George Kelly (baseball) (1895–1984), American baseball player
George "Machine Gun" Kelly (1895–1954), American gangster
George Kelly (musician) (1915–1998), American jazz tenor saxophonist and arranger
George Kelly (psychologist) (1905–1967), American psychologist
George Kelly (playwright), American playwright and uncle of Princess Grace
Gerry Kelly (broadcaster), Ulster Television presenter
Gerry Kelly, Sinn Féin politician
Grace Kelly (1929–1982), American film actress, Princess of Monaco
Graham Kelly (football administrator) (born c. 1945), English football administrator, formerly of the Football Association and the Football League
Guy E. Kelly, American politician
Gwen Kelly (1922–2012), Australian novelist and short-story writer
Harry Kelly (politician) (1895–1971), Governor of Michigan
Helen Kelly (trade unionist) (1964–2016), New Zealand trade unionist
Henry Kelly (born 1946), Irish television presenter
Henry Kelly (born 1991), Game Artist & Author
Henry Kelly (VC), Irish Victoria Cross recipient
Hugh Kelly (poet) (1739–1777), Irish dramatist and poet
Hughie Kelly (1923–2009), Scottish international footballer
Hugh Kelly (goalkeeper) (1919–1977), Northern Irish international footballer
Hugh Craine Kelly (1848–1891), farmer and MHA in South Australia

J–M
Jack Kelly (actor) (1927–1992), American actor
Jackie Kelly (born 1964), Australian politician
James Kelly (basketball) (born 1993), American basketball player in the Israel Basketball Premier League
James Kelly (Irish Army officer) (1929–2003), Irish army officer
James Kelly (U.S. representative) (1760–1819), U.S. politician
James A. Kelly (born 1936), U.S. politician
James Butler Knill Kelly (1832–1907), Scottish-born Canadian Anglican bishop, later Primus of the Scottish Episcopal Church
James K. Kelly (1819–1903), American senator
James M. Kelly (astronaut) (born 1964), American astronaut
James M. Kelly (Maryland politician) (born 1960), American
James Patrick Kelly (born 1951), American science fiction author
James Plunkett Kelly (1920–2003), Irish writer, author of Strumpet City
Jane Louise Kelly, Judge of the United States Court of Appeals for the Eighth Circuit
Janis Kelly (volleyball) (born 1971), Canadian volleyball player
Janis Kelly (soprano), Scottish operatic soprano
Jean-Baptiste Kelly (1783–1854), Canadian vicar-general
Jean Louisa Kelly (born 1972), American actress
Jeremiah Kelly (1900–1962), Scottish footballer
Jermaine Kelly (born 1995), American football player
Jill Kelly (actress) (born 1971), American pornographic actress
Jim "Spider" Kelly (1912–?), Northern Irish boxer of the 1920s, '30s and '40s
Jim Kelly (born 1960), American football quarterback
Jimmy Kelly (American football), NFL player
Jo Ann Kelly (1944–1990), English blues singer and guitarist
Joanne Kelly (born 1980), Canadian actress
Joe Kelly (disambiguation), several people
John Kelly (architect) (1840–1904)
John Kelly (academic) (born 1955), Vice President Clemson University and President Florida Atlantic University
John Kelly (running back) (born 1996), American football player
John Robert Kelly (1849–1919), politician in South Australia, farmer in SA then Queensland.
Joe Kelly (racing driver), Formula 1 driver in the 1950 & 1951 British Grand Prix
John B. Kelly Sr., Olympic medaling rower; father of Grace Kelly and John B. Kelly Jr.
John B. Kelly Jr., aka Jack Kelly, Olympic medaling rower, politician, president of the US Olympic Committee
John F. Kelly (born 1950), U.S. Marine Corps general, Trump administration chief of staff
John J. Kelly, Medal of Honor recipient
John Larry Kelly Jr., Bell Labs scientist who formulated the Kelly criterion
John Melville Kelly (1877–1962), American artist
John Norman Davidson Kelly (1909–1997), theologian and principal of St Edmund Hall, Oxford University
Johnny Kelly (born 1968), American musician
Joseph Kelly (disambiguation), several people
Josephine Gates Kelly (1888-1976), Native American activist and politician
Kameron Kelly (born 1996), American football player
Karen Kelly Irish camogie player
Kate Kelly (disambiguation)
Katherine Kelly (actress), English actress, best known as Becky McDonald in Coronation Street
Kathy Kelly, pacifist
Keith Kelly (singer) (born 1935), English pop singer, guitarist and songwriter
Kelly Kelly, ring name of American professional wrestler Barbara Blank (born 1987)
Kelly O'Rourke, local grocer
Ken Kelly (disambiguation)
Kevin Kelly (editor), Executive editor of Wired
Kevin T. Kelly (born 1960), American Postmodern Pop Artist
Kieran Kelly (disambiguation)
King Kelly (1857–1894), American baseball player
Klesie Kelly, American soprano
Kyu Blu Kelly (born 2000), American football player
Laura Kelly (born 1950), American politician
Lee Charles Kelley, American dog trainer and mystery novelist
Leonard "Red" Kelly (1927–2019), Canadian hockey player and politician
Liam Kelly (Irish republican), (1922-2011), paramilitary leader and elected official
Lisa Kelly (born 1977), Irish singer (Celtic Woman soloist)
Lisa Kelly (trucker), television personality
Lisa Robin Kelly (1975–2013), American actress
Lorraine Kelly, Scottish television presenter
Luke Kelly (1940–1984), Irish singer and folk musician
Luke Kelly (rugby league) (born 1989), Australian rugby league player
Lynne Kelly (science writer) (born 1951), Australian writer
Maeve Kelly (born 1930), Irish writer
Manus Kelly, Irish businessman and rally driver
Marie-Noële Kelly (1901–1995), Belgian-born hostess and traveller
Mark Kelly (disambiguation), several people
Martin Kelly (disambiguation), several people
Martin Kelly (footballer), English footballer, currently playing for Crystal Palace
Mary Kelly (artist) (born 1941), American artist and writer
Mary Jane Kelly (c. 1863 – 1888), British prostitute and victim of Jack the Ripper
Matthew Kelly (born 1950), British television presenter
Matthew Kelly (musician), American rock musician
Megyn Kelly (born 1970), American newscaster
Melissa J. Kelly (born 1962), Maryland (USA) politician
Merrill Kelly (born 1988), American baseball player
Mervin Kelly (1894–1971), American physicist
Michael Kelly (disambiguation)
Michael Kelly (physicist), New Zealand-British physicist
Michael Kelly (tenor) (1762–1826), Irish actor, singer and composer
Michael Kelly (bishop), fourth Roman Catholic Archbishop of Sydney
Michael Kelly (sport shooter) (1872–1923), American Olympic sport shooter
Michael Kelly (editor), American writer and editor
Michael Kelly (Lord Provost), former Lord Provost of the City of Glasgow and businessman
Michael Kelly (actor), American actor featured in Dawn of the Dead (2004)
Michael Kelly (baseball), American baseball player
Michael Eugene Kelly, automotive manufacturing entrepreneur and investment holding businessman
Mike Kelly (journalist), contemporary American journalist
Mike Kelly (born 1942), English football goalkeeper and goalkeeping coach
Mike Kelly (outfielder) (born 1970), baseball outfielder
Mike Kelly (Australian politician), contemporary Australian politician
Minka Kelly, American actress
Moira Kelly, American actress

N–Z
Nancy Kelly (1921–1995), American actress
Natália Kelly (born 1994), Austrian singer
Ned Kelly (1854–1880), Australian outlaw
Neil Kelly, British rugby league footballer and coach
Noel Kelly (disambiguation), several people
Parker Kelly (born 1999), Canadian ice hockey player
Pat Kelly (trade unionist) (1929–2004), New Zealand trade unionist
Patrick Kelly (disambiguation)
Paul Kelly (journalist), Australian
Paul Kelly (disambiguation), multiple people
Paula Kelly (disambiguation), several people
Petra Kelly (1947–1992), co-founder of German Green Party
Raymond Kelly (disambiguation), multiple people
Regan Kelly (born 1981), Canadian ice hockey player
Richard Kelly (director) (born 1975), American
Richard Kelly (Florida politician) (1924–2005), American
Rick Kelly (born 1983), Australian racing driver
Robert Kelly (poet) (born 1935), American poet
Robert Kelly (politician) (1845–1920), MHA of South Australia
Robert Kelly (singer) (born 1967), birth name of R. Kelly, American singer-songwriter, and record producer
Ruth Kelly (born 1968), British politician
Ryan Kelly (disambiguation)
Samantha Kelly, American voice actress
Scott Kelly (disambiguation), several people
Sean Kelly (cyclist) (born 1956), Irish
Stuart Kelly (rugby league) (born 1976), Australian rugby league player
Stuart Kelly (footballer) (born 1981), Scottish footballer
Stuart Kelly (literary critic), Scottish critic and author
Sue W. Kelly (born 1936), American politician
T. C. Kelly (1917–1985), Irish composer
The Kelly Family, European-American musicians
Thomas Kelly (cricketer)
Thomas Kelly (Medal of Honor, 1898), American Medal of Honor recipient
Thomas C. Kelly, Archbishop of the Archdiocese of Louisville, Kentucky
Thomas Forrest Kelly (born 1943), American musicologist
Thomas J. Kelly (Irish nationalist)
Thomas J. Kelly (Medal of Honor), American Medal of Honor recipient
Thomas Raymond Kelly (Quaker mystic) (1893–1941), Quaker mystic
Todd Kelly (born 1979), Australian racing driver
Tom Kelly (baseball) (born 1950), manager of the American baseball team the Minnesota Twins
Thomas J. Kelly (aerospace engineer) (1929–2002), American aerospace engineer
Tom Kelly (Gaelic footballer), footballer
Tom Kelly (SDLP politician), media commentator and member of the Social Democratic and Labour Party in Northern Ireland
Tom Kelly (musician), American songwriter
Tommy Kelly (actor) (1925–2016), American child actor
Ty Kelly (born 1988), American-Israeli baseball player
Van Kelly, baseball player
Walt Kelly (1913–1973), American cartoonist
Walter F. Kelly (1874–1961), American college sports coach
William Kelly (inventor) (1811–1888), American
William Kelly (Alabama politician) (1786–1834), American politician
William Kelly (Bible scholar) (1821–1906), member of the Plymouth Brethren
William Osmund Kelly, Flint, Michigan Mayor, 1940–44
William W. J. Kelly, Lieutenant Governor of Florida, 1865–68
Wynton Kelly (1931–1971), Jamaican-born jazz pianist
Xavier Kelly (born 1997), American football player
Zack Kelly (born 1995), American baseball player

O'Kelly
Albéric O'Kelly de Galway (1911–1980), Belgian chess grandmaster
Aloysius O'Kelly (1853–1936), Irish painter, brother of James Joseph O'Kelly
Christopher O'Kelly (1895–1922), Canadian recipient of the Victoria Cross
Claire O'Kelly (1916–2004), Irish archaeologist
Don O'Kelly (1924–1966), American actor
Gabriel O'Kelly (died 1731), Bishop of Elphin from 1718 to 1731
James Joseph O'Kelly (1845–1916), Irish politician
John J. O'Kelly (1872–1957), Irish politician
Joseph O'Kelly (1828–1885), Franco-Irish composer, and his brothers Auguste (1829–1900) and George (1831–1914)
Malcolm O'Kelly (born 1974), Irish rugby player
Seán T. O'Kelly (1882–1966), second President of Ireland
Seumas O'Kelly (1881–1918), Irish writer

Kelley 
Abby Kelley (1811–1887), Quaker abolitionist and social reformer; mentor of Susan B. Anthony
Alfred Kelley (1789–1859), American lawyer, canal builder, railroad magnate, and legislator
Alton Kelley an American artist
Ann Kelley, British writer
Ann E. Kelley, American neurosurgeon (1954–2007), American neuroscientist
Augustine B. Kelley (1883–1957), US Congressman from Pennsylvania, grandfather of Sheila Kelly
Brian Kelley (disambiguation), several people
Charles Kelley, musician
Clarence M. Kelley (1911–1977)
Cole Kelley (born 1997), American football player
David Kelley (born 1949), American objectivist philosopher
David E. Kelley (born 1956), American television writer and producer
Dean M. Kelley (1927–1977), American author and religious freedom advocate
DeForest Kelley (1920–1999), actor, famous for Star Trek
Devin Kelley (born 1986), American actress
Douglas Kelley (1912–1958), American psychiatrist at the Nuremberg War Trials
Edward Kelley (1555–1597), alchemist and spirit medium, possible creator of Enochian
Florence Kelley (1859–1932), social/consumer safety/civil rights activist
Francis Kelley (1870–1948), American Roman Catholic Bishop
Geoffrey Kelley (born 1955), Canadian politician
Harold Kelley, psychologist
Harold Kelley (rugby league), Australian rugby league footballer
Homer Kelley (1907–1983), American golf instructor
Honora Kelley (1857–1938), American serial killer
Horace Kelley (1819–1890), American businessman and co-founder of the Cleveland Museum of Art
Ike Kelley (born 1944), American football player
Jack Kelley (journalist), disgraced American journalist
Jacquelyn Kelley (1926–1988), All-American Girls Professional Baseball League
Jill Kelley (born 1975), American socialite and volunteer military liaison; connected with 2012 scandals involving Generals David Petraeus and John R. Allen, as well as the FBI
Joseph James Kelley (1871–1943), American baseball player
John L. Kelley (1916–1999), mathematician
Johnny Kelley (1907–2004), American long-distance runner
Josh Kelley, singer/songwriter
Joshua Kelley (born 1997), American football player
Ken Kelley (American football) (born 1960), American football player
Ken Kelley (journalist) (1949–2008), American journalist and publisher
Kenneth Keith Kelley (1901-1991), American chemist
Kevin Kelley (boxer)
Kevin Daniel Kelley, American drummer with The Byrds
Kitty Kelley (born 1942), American journalist and author
Lee Charles Kelley (born 1951), American mystery novelist and dog trainer
Liam Kelley (historian) (born 1966), American historian specialised in Vietnam
Mike Kelley (artist) (1954–2012), American artist
Mike Kelley (baseball) (1875–1955), American baseball player and manager in the minor leagues
Mike Kelley (American football), American football quarterback for San Diego Chargers
Mikey Kelley (born 1973), American voice actor
Oliver Hudson Kelley (1826–1913)
Paul X. Kelley (1928–2019), 28th Commandant of the U.S. Marine Corps
Paula Kelley (born 1970), American indie singer-songwriter
Peter Kelley (born 1974), American weightlifter
Robert Kelley (American football) (born 1992), American football running back
Shawn Kelley (born 1984), American baseball player
Sheila Kelley (American actress), actress, founder of S-Factor, granddaughter of senator Augustine B. Kelley
Thomas P. Kelley (1905–1982), Canadian author
Trevor Kelley (born 1993), American baseball player
Vince Kelley (born 1962), American/Australian basketball player
William Kelley (disambiguation), several people
William "Pig-Iron" Kelley (1814–1890), Quaker abolitionist, US Congressman from Pennsylvania

As first name
Kelley Abbey (born 1966), Australian actress
Kelley Armstrong (born 1968), Canadian author
Kelley Eckels Currie, American lawyer and government official
Kelley Deal (born 1961), American musician
Kelley Hurley (born 1988), American fencer
Kelley Jakle (born 1989), American actress
Kelley Johnson (born 1993), American pageant competitor
Kelley Johnson (footballer) (born 1992), Puerto Rican footballer
Kelley Jones (born 1962), American comics artist
Kelley Linck (born 1963), American politician
Kelley Lovelace, American songwriter
Kelley Earnhardt Miller (born 1972), American businesswoman
Kelley O'Hara (born 1988), American soccer player
Kelley Paul (born 1963), American politician
Kelley Puckett, American comic book writer
Kelley Stoltz (born 1971), American musician
Kelley Washington (born 1979), American football player

Fictional Characters
Kurt Kelly, a character from the 1988 black comedy Heathers, and its musical and TV adaptations

References

Anglicised Irish-language surnames
Gaelic-language surnames
Cornish-language surnames
English-language surnames
Irish families
Patronymic surnames
Surnames of Irish origin
Toponymic surnames